Christian Jost may refer to:

Falk Maria Schlegel (born 1975), German keyboardist, real name Christian Jost
Christian Jost (geographer), French geographer
Christian Jost (composer) (born 1963), German composer, conductor, and pianist